General elections were held in Sweden between 4 and 17 September 1920, the last before universal suffrage was introduced the following year. The Social Democratic Party remained the largest party, winning 75 of the 230 seats in the Second Chamber of the Riksdag. Later in October 1920 Hjalmar Branting was succeeded as prime minister by Baron Louis De Geer.

Results

References

General elections in Sweden
Sweden
General
Sweden